The Ramakrishna Mission Siksha Mandir, Sarisha or Sarisha Ramakrishna Mission Siksha Mandir is a semi-residential Bengali Medium, premium higher secondary school in Sarisha, in South 24 Parganas near Kolkata, India. It was established in 1921. It is affiliated with the West Bengal Board of Secondary Education.

About Sarisha RKMSM
Sarisha Ramakrishna Mission Siksha Mandir was founded in 1921, in a small village named Sarisha, mainly for education of the villagers, and now it is a well known Higher Secondary School with 1152 students. It has hostel for about 170 boys, studying on 5 to class 10, huge playground, featuring football, cricket and volley ball and other indoor games. The school is one of the best school in the sub- division of Diamond Harbour.

See also
 List of Ramakrishna Mission institutions

References

External links
 Headquarters of Math and Mission in Belur
 belurmath.org

Schools affiliated with the Ramakrishna Mission
Educational institutions established in 1921
Boarding schools in West Bengal
1921 establishments in India